Bon Zard-e Olya (also Romanized as Bon Zard-e ‘Olyā and Bon Zard ‘Olyā; also known as Bon Zard and Bon Zard-e Bālā) is a village in Pataveh Rural District, Pataveh District, Dana County, Kohgiluyeh and Boyer-Ahmad Province, Iran. At the 2006 census, its population was 603, in 126 families.

References 

Populated places in Dana County